Diaporthaceae is a plant pathogen family.

Genera 
Allantoporthe
Aporhytisma
Clypeoporthella
Diaporthe
Diaporthopsis
Leucodiaporthe
Mazzantia
Mazzantiella
Phomopsis
Septomazzantia

References

External links 

 
Fungal plant pathogens and diseases